Lily is an unincorporated community and coal town in Laurel County, Kentucky, United States. Their post office has been open since 1881.

References

Unincorporated communities in Laurel County, Kentucky
Unincorporated communities in Kentucky
Coal towns in Kentucky